The 1946 Cornell Big Red football team was an American football team that represented Cornell University in the Ivy League during the 1946 college football season. In its second season under head coach Edward McKeever, the team compiled a 5–4 record and outscored its opponents 135 to 115. Joe Martin was the team captain. 

Walter Kretz led Cornell and ranked 17th nationally with 602 rushing yards and averaged 6.76 yards per carry.

Cornell played its home games at Schoellkopf Field in Ithaca, New York.

Schedule

After the season

The 1947 NFL Draft was held on December 16, 1946. The following Big Red was selected.

References

Cornell
Cornell Big Red football seasons
Cornell Big Red football